James McPhail Rodger (born 15 September 1933) is a Scottish former footballer. Rodger played for Rangers, St Mirren, Newport County, Hearts, Queen of the South and East Fife.

References

External links 
 
 Jim Rodger, London Hearts Supporters' Club

1933 births
Living people
People from Cleland, North Lanarkshire
Association football wingers
Scottish footballers
Rangers F.C. players
St Mirren F.C. players
Newport County A.F.C. players
Heart of Midlothian F.C. players
Queen of the South F.C. players
East Fife F.C. players
Scottish Football League players
English Football League players
Footballers from North Lanarkshire